Hey Eugene! is the third studio album by American band Pink Martini, released on May 15, 2007, by Pink Martini's own record label, Heinz Records. The album is named after the track "Hey Eugene", a fan favorite at the band's live concerts. As with most Pink Martini albums, Hey Eugene! features lyrics in several languages: French, Portuguese, Spanish, Japanese, Russian, Arabic, and English. The song "Bukra wba'do", meaning "tomorrow and the day after" in Arabic, describes a lover's anticipation of a first date.

Commercial performance
Hey Eugene! debuted at number 30 on the US Billboard 200, selling 19,000 copies in its first week. As of 2009, 140,000 copies have been sold in the United States, according to Nielsen SoundScan. In 2014 it was awarded a diamond certification from the Independent Music Companies Association, denoting sales in excess of 200,000 copies across Europe. According to Pink Martini, the album has sold more than 350,000 copies worldwide.

Track listing

Notes
 "Mar Desconocido" includes an excerpt of "Waltz in C#-minor" by Frédéric Chopin.
 "Dosvedanya Mio Bombino" includes an excerpt of "The Happy Wanderer" by Friedrich-Wilhelm Möller.

Personnel
 China Forbes, vocals
 Timothy Nishimoto, vocals & percussion
 Gavin Bondy, trumpet
 Robert Taylor, trombone & trumpet
 Nicholas Crosa, violin
 Paloma Griffin, violin
 Pansy Chang, cello
 Brant Taylor, cello
 Dan Faehnle, guitar
 Phil Baker, guitar & upright bass
 Maureen Love, harp
 Brian Davis, congas & percussion
 Derek Rieth, congas & percussion
 Martín Zarzar, cavaquinho, drums & percussion
 Thomas Lauderdale, piano

With the David York Ensemble ("Syracuse"), The Jefferson High School Gospel Choir ("Tempo Perdido"), the MarchFourth Marching Band ("Dosvedanya Mio Bombino"), and the Harvey Rosencrantz Orchestra ("Everywhere", "Syracuse")

Charts

Weekly charts

Year-end charts

Certifications

References

External links
 Hey Eugene! at PinkMartini.com
 David York Ensemble website
 MarchFourth Marching Band website

2007 albums
Heinz Records albums
Pink Martini albums